The Rats (1974) is a horror novel  by British writer James Herbert. This was Herbert's first novel and included graphic depictions of death and mutilation. A film adaptation was made in 1982, called Deadly Eyes. A 1985 adventure game for the Commodore 64 and ZX Spectrum based on the book was published by Hodder & Stoughton Ltd and produced by GXT (Five Ways Software). The Rats was followed by three sequels, Lair (1979), Domain (1984) and The City (1993) (the last one was a graphic novel). All three books were sold as a trilogy and were very well received by the public and horror fans.

Background
Herbert became inspired to write The Rats in early 1972, while watching Tod Browning's Dracula; specifically, after seeing the scene in which Renfield describes his recurring nightmare about hordes of rats. Linking the film to childhood memories he had of rats in London's East End.
Herbert stated in later interviews that he wrote the book primarily as a pastime: "It seemed like a good idea at the time, I was as naive as that." The manuscript was typed by Herbert's wife Eileen, who sent it off after nine months to nine different publishers.

Plot
The novel opens by introducing the reader to an alcoholic vagrant, resting in an abandoned and forgotten lock-keeper's house by a canal. As he is ruminating over the injustices inflicted upon him in his life, he is suddenly set upon by a pack of black rats the size of small dogs, and is devoured alive.

Harris, a young East London art teacher, notices that one of his students has a bloodied bandage around his hand. When he enquires as to what caused the damage, the student answers that he was attacked by a rat.
Meanwhile, a baby girl and her dog are killed by the giant rats, now aided by packs of smaller black rats. The girl's mother rescues her daughter's mutilated body, but not before sustaining bites as well.
Harris takes the student to the hospital and sees the grieving mother with her dead child. According to the doctor, the number of seemingly unprovoked rat attacks has strangely increased.

The next rat attack occurs at the remains of a bombsite, where a group of squabbling vagrants are slaughtered.
Harris is visited at work by the Minister of Health, Mr. Foskins, who reveals that the bitten student, and all the other surviving victims of rat attacks, died of a mysterious disease 24 hours after being bitten. Foskins asks Harris to keep the existence of the disease a secret and lead an exterminator named Ferris to the area where the student had been bitten. Accompanied by Ferris, Harris goes to the canal described by the student and sights a group of giant rats. Harris attempts to contact the police, while Ferris follows the rats, who then attack and kill him.

The rat attacks become increasingly more daring, as more and more public places are attacked. A tube station is assaulted, leaving few survivors. Next, Harris' own school is attacked, resulting in the death of the headmaster. With the existence of the rats' disease now becoming public knowledge, a meeting is held, in which a young researcher by the name of Stephen Howard comes up with the idea of using a virus to infect the rats. The virus is injected into several puppies, which are left in areas of the attacks. This results in the deaths of thousands of rats, which crawl to the surface to die. A few weeks later however, the rats adapt to the virus, at the same time losing the toxicity of their bites. The rats brutally attack a cinema and overrun the London Zoo. Based on the fact that rats communicate with each other using ultrasound, a plan is formulated to use ultrasonic machines to lure the rats into poison gas chambers.

Foskins is dismissed as Health Minister and reveals to Harris that he has been investigating possible clues as to the rats' origins and comes to the conclusion that they were illegally smuggled into the country by a zoologist named William Bartlett Schiller from an island near New Guinea which had been near some nuclear tests. At his home by an East London canal, Schiller had bred these mutant rats with common black rats, producing a new and deadly strain. They later killed him and escaped.

Pursuing the disgraced health minister past waves of entranced rats, Harris finds the abandoned house and enters it. He goes into the cellar and finds Foskins' corpse being devoured by rats of unusually great size. He kills them after a bloody battle and discovers the rats' alpha hidden in the shadows; a white, hairless and obese rat with two heads. Harris kills the creature with an axe in a fit of rage and leaves.

The epilogue indicates that one female rat survived the purge by being trapped in the basement of a grocery shop. There, it gives birth to a new litter, including a new white two-headed rat.

Critical reception
The first paperback edition sold out after three weeks. The Rats received harsh criticism upon its publication. It was deemed to be far too graphic in its portrayals of death and mutilation, and the social commentary regarding the neglect of London's suburbs was said to be too extreme. For some reviewers, the novel was not literature, and not a good example of good writing. However, many consider the novel to be social commentary influenced by Herbert's harsh upbringing in immediate post-war London. Ramsey Campbell lauded the novel, saying "The Rats announces at once that he (Herbert) won't be confined by the conventions of English macabre fiction." Campbell praised the use of the theme of "Original Sin" in The Rats, saying "that the book can discuss its underlying themes so directly without becoming pretentious...is one of Herbert's strengths." Campbell also defended Herbert's use of violence and indigence as both integral to The Rats' plot, and a break from the clichés of the horror fiction of that time period.

The underlying theme of the novel is the lack of care by the government toward the underclass and a lack of reaction to a tragedy until it is already too late. Fellow author Peter James stated "I think Jim reinvented the horror genre and brought it into the modern world. He set a benchmark with his writing that many writers subsequently have tried, without success, to emulate."

References

1974 British novels
1974 science fiction novels
1974 debut novels
British horror novels
British novels adapted into films
Books about mice and rats
Novels set in London
Novels by James Herbert
New English Library books